Rhodymenia cinnabarina is a species of red algae first described in 1841.

References

Rhodymeniales
Plants described in 1841